The Royal Hamilton Light Infantry Band is the regimental band of the Royal Hamilton Light Infantry. The Royal Hamilton Light Infantry Band is the oldest enlisted band in Canada. Abbreviated to the RHLI Band, it has played an extensive role in the musical culture and history of Hamilton, Ontario.

History
It was created in 1866 by Peter Grossman, a German-born musician and instrumentalist, who created what was then known as the 13th Battalion Band, at the request of the commander of the 13th Battalion Voluntary Militia. Grossman, who had been the bandmaster of the Hamilton Artillery Band (founded in 1856), led the 13th Battalion Band until 1869. He was eventually succeeded in the long term by George R. Robinson, who was a graduate of the RSMS (Kneller Hall), London. He is best known for keeping the entire band in line with the latest developments in American military bands, adding clarinets, saxophones, french horns, flutes, oboes, and bassoons to the ensemble by the end of his tenure. During its first 10 years in existence the-40-piece band successfully toured areas throughout Eastern Canada and the Northeastern United States. In 1900 the band was invited to give a concert for the Maple Leaf Club of Denver, Colorado. In 1901, the band was chosen to play at a state dinner in Toronto honouring of the Duke and Duchess of Cornwall (later King George V and Mary of Teck). 

For many years, the band gave weekly public concerts in the regimental drill shed, while during the summer it often filled as many as five or six engagements a week. At the time of Robinson's retirement in 1917, his son William succeeded his father and served as bandmaster until 1924.  He was succeeded by David Anderson, who served for 10 years before returning to lead the band for the rest of the 1930s. The band was disbanded in 1957, and the reconstituted in 1962 for the regimental centennial, supporting the RHLI for 10 years before it was disbanded again in 1972 and once again revived in 1992 under the direction of Major Michael A. Rehill.

List of directors of music

Ensembles
The RHLI Band is composed of the following ensembles:

 RHLI Marching Band – It is the only ensemble of the band that is taken out to parade on the streets of Hamilton. It is the most notable part of the RHLI Band, also performing in military tattoos and ceremonial occasions. It performs in the traditional scarlet uniform of the RHLI and the regimental Pith helmet.
 RHLI Concert Band – Performs in symphonic settings. It usually performs any type of music.
 RHLI Brass Quintet – It is five-piece musical group which consists of two trumpets, a horn, a trombone, and a tuba. Their musical repertoire main consists of all types of music.
 RHLI Dance Band – It performs at many formal dinner events throughout the City of Hamilton. Also referred to as the big band, its repertoire is much more diverse than the other 3 ensembles. It plays a variety of genres including smooth jazz, polka, and rock.

Present day activities
The RHLI Band musical schedule includes several activities: 

 Military Parades
 Regimental Dinners
 Concerts
 Regimental Holidays
 State Dinners
 Presentation of Colours
 Graduation Parades

Since 1992, the band has also performed at numerous military tattoos, festivals and celebrations. The following is a list of the numerous notable performances the band has given in its existence:

 1871 Peace Jubilee in Berlin
 1921 Canadian National Exhibition (the band won first place
 1939 royal tour of Canada 
 84th Grey Cup 
 1998 royal visit
 2002 royal visit 
 60th Anniversary of the Dieppe Raid in France
 2016 Sounding Retreat in London

See also
 Royal Hamilton Light Infantry
 Canadian military bands
 Military band

Notes

References

External links
 
 Michael A. Rehill Official Website

Musical groups from Hamilton, Ontario
Royal Hamilton Light Infantry (Wentworth Regiment)
Bands of the Canadian Army
Musical groups established in 1866
1866 establishments in Canada